Bernos, also transliterated as Barnos and Burnos, is a wool cloak-like garment and hood woven in one piece, traditionally worn by men of the Amhara ethnic group of Ethiopia, most commonly in the relatively cold Shewa. The term seems to be an adaptation of the Maghrebi Burnous. Unlike its Arab counterparts, it is typically black, and does not have a hood; rather it has a large point on one side of the shoulders, usually the left. The point was tailored into existence in order to keep a rifle on their shoulders, so that highlander men would not have to hold them outside where rainwater entering through a muzzle might damage (an older) firearm. Donald N. Levine notes that the wealthier men of Menz "wear the barnos, a tailored cape made of dark wool."

The bernos was frequently worn by the prominent and elite highlanders. Today, average citizens sometimes wear it in traditional ceremonies and at special occasions. Social status is indicated by the garment's decorative pattern.

References

External links 
 What is bernos
 A burnos as worn

Robes and cloaks
Ethiopian clothing